200 series may refer to:

Japanese train types
 200 Series Shinkansen
 Meitetsu 200 series EMU, a variant of the Meitetsu 100 series
 Tobu 200 series EMU
 KiHa E200 DMU
 Kominato Railway KiHa 200 series DMU

Computers
 ThinkPad 200 series, a line of laptop computers
 Radeon Rx 200 series
 GeForce 200 series graphics processing units produced by Nvidia

See also
 Series 2 (disambiguation)
 200 (disambiguation)
 2000 series (disambiguation)